Henry VIII (28 June 149128 January 1547) was King of England from 22 April 1509 until his death in 1547. Henry is best known for his six marriages, and for his efforts to have his first marriage (to Catherine of Aragon) annulled. His disagreement with Pope Clement VII about such an annulment led Henry to initiate the English Reformation, separating the Church of England from papal authority. He appointed himself Supreme Head of the Church of England and dissolved convents and monasteries, for which he was excommunicated by the pope. Henry is also known as the "father of the Royal Navy" as he invested heavily in the English fleet, establishing a standing navy which he expanded from seven to some fifty ships over his lifetime, and developed its command structure.

Domestically, Henry is known for his radical changes to the English Constitution, ushering in the theory of the divine right of kings in opposition to papal supremacy. He also greatly expanded royal power during his reign. He frequently used charges of treason and heresy to quell dissent, and those accused were often executed without a formal trial by means of bills of attainder. He achieved many of his political aims through the work of his chief ministers, some of whom were banished or executed when they fell out of his favour. Thomas Wolsey, Thomas More, Thomas Cromwell, and Thomas Cranmer all figured prominently in his administration.

Henry was an extravagant spender, using the proceeds from the dissolution of the monasteries and acts of the Reformation Parliament. He also converted the money that was formerly paid to Rome into royal revenue. Despite the money from these sources, he was continually on the verge of financial ruin due to his personal extravagance as well as multiple costly and largely unproductive wars, particularly with King Francis I of France, Holy Roman Emperor Charles V, King James V of Scotland and the Scottish regency under the Earl of Arran and Mary of Guise. At home, he oversaw the annexure of Wales to England with the Laws in Wales Acts 1535 and 1542 and was the first English monarch to rule as King of Ireland following the Crown of Ireland Act 1542.

Henry's contemporaries considered him to be an attractive, educated and accomplished king. He has been described as "one of the most charismatic rulers to sit on the English throne" and his reign has been described as the "most important" in English history. He was an author and composer. As he aged, he became severely overweight and his health suffered. He is frequently characterised in his later life as a lustful, egotistical, paranoid and tyrannical monarch. He was succeeded by his son Edward VI.

Early years 

Born on 28 June 1491 at the Palace of Placentia in Greenwich, Kent, Henry Tudor was the third child and second son of King Henry VII and Elizabeth of York. Of the young Henry's six (or seven) siblings, only three – his brother Arthur, Prince of Wales, and sisters Margaret and Mary – survived infancy. He was baptised by Richard Foxe, the Bishop of Exeter, at a church of the Observant Franciscans close to the palace. In 1493, at the age of two, Henry was appointed Constable of Dover Castle and Lord Warden of the Cinque Ports. He was subsequently appointed Earl Marshal of England and Lord Lieutenant of Ireland at age three and was made a Knight of the Bath soon after. The day after the ceremony, he was created Duke of York and a month or so later made Warden of the Scottish Marches. In May 1495, he was appointed to the Order of the Garter. The reason for giving such appointments to a small child was to enable his father to retain personal control of lucrative positions and not share them with established families. Not much is known about Henry's early life – save for his appointments – because he was not expected to become king, but it is known that he received a first-rate education from leading tutors. He became fluent in Latin and French and learned at least some Italian.

In November 1501, Henry played a considerable part in the ceremonies surrounding his brother Arthur's marriage to Catherine, the youngest child of King Ferdinand II of Aragon and Queen Isabella I of Castile. As Duke of York, Henry used the arms of his father as king, differenced by a label of three points ermine. He was further honoured on 9 February 1506 by Holy Roman Emperor Maximilian I, who made him a Knight of the Golden Fleece.

In 1502, Arthur died at the age of 15, possibly of sweating sickness, just 20 weeks after his marriage to Catherine. Arthur's death thrust all his duties upon his younger brother. The 10-year-old Henry became the new Duke of Cornwall, and the new Prince of Wales and Earl of Chester in February 1504. Henry VII gave his second son few responsibilities even after the death of Arthur. Young Henry was strictly supervised and did not appear in public. As a result, he ascended the throne "untrained in the exacting art of kingship".

Henry VII renewed his efforts to seal a marital alliance between England and Spain, by offering his son Henry in marriage to the widowed Catherine. Both Henry VII and Catherine's mother Queen Isabella were keen on the idea, which had arisen very shortly after Arthur's death. On 23 June 1503, a treaty was signed for their marriage, and they were betrothed two days later. A papal dispensation was only needed for the "impediment of public honesty" if the marriage had not been consummated as Catherine and her duenna claimed, but Henry VII and the Spanish ambassador set out instead to obtain a dispensation for "affinity", which took account of the possibility of consummation. Cohabitation was not possible because Henry was too young. Isabella's death in 1504, and the ensuing problems of succession in Castile, complicated matters. Catherine's father Ferdinand preferred her to stay in England, but Henry VII's relations with Ferdinand had deteriorated. Catherine was therefore left in limbo for some time, culminating in Prince Henry's rejection of the marriage as soon he was able, at the age of 14. Ferdinand's solution was to make his daughter ambassador, allowing her to stay in England indefinitely. Devout, she began to believe that it was God's will that she marry the prince despite his opposition.

Early reign 

Henry VII died on 21 April 1509, and the 17-year-old Henry succeeded him as king. Soon after his father's burial on 10 May, Henry suddenly declared that he would indeed marry Catherine, leaving unresolved several issues concerning the papal dispensation and a missing part of the marriage portion. The new king maintained that it had been his father's dying wish that he marry Catherine. Whether or not this was true, it was certainly convenient. Emperor Maximilian I had been attempting to marry his granddaughter Eleanor, Catherine's niece, to Henry; she had now been jilted. Henry's wedding to Catherine was kept low-key and was held at the friar's church in Greenwich on 11 June 1509. Henry claimed descent from Constantine the Great and King Arthur and saw himself as their successor.

On 23 June 1509, Henry led the now 23-year-old Catherine from the Tower of London to Westminster Abbey for their coronation, which took place the following day. It was a grand affair: the king's passage was lined with tapestries and laid with fine cloth. Following the ceremony, there was a grand banquet in Westminster Hall. As Catherine wrote to her father, "our time is spent in continuous festival".

Two days after his coronation, Henry arrested his father's two most unpopular ministers, Sir Richard Empson and Edmund Dudley. They were charged with high treason and were executed in 1510. Politically motivated executions would remain one of Henry's primary tactics for dealing with those who stood in his way. Henry also returned some of the money supposedly extorted by the two ministers. By contrast, Henry's view of the House of York – potential rival claimants for the throne – was more moderate than his father's had been. Several who had been imprisoned by his father, including Thomas Grey, 2nd Marquess of Dorset, were pardoned. Others went unreconciled; Edmund de la Pole was eventually beheaded in 1513, an execution prompted by his brother Richard siding against the king.

Soon after marrying Henry, Catherine conceived. She gave birth to a stillborn girl on 31 January 1510. About four months later, Catherine again became pregnant. On 1 January 1511, New Year's Day, a son Henry was born. After the grief of losing their first child, the couple were pleased to have a boy and festivities were held, including a two-day joust known as the Westminster Tournament. However, the child died seven weeks later. Catherine had two stillborn sons in 1513 and 1515, but gave birth in February 1516 to a girl, Mary. Relations between Henry and Catherine had been strained, but they eased slightly after Mary's birth.

Although Henry's marriage to Catherine has since been described as "unusually good", it is known that Henry took mistresses. It was revealed in 1510 that Henry had been conducting an affair with one of the sisters of Edward Stafford, 3rd Duke of Buckingham, either Elizabeth or Anne Hastings, Countess of Huntingdon. The most significant mistress for about three years, starting in 1516, was Elizabeth Blount. Blount is one of only two completely undisputed mistresses, considered by some to be few for a virile young king. Exactly how many Henry had is disputed: David Loades believes Henry had mistresses "only to a very limited extent", whilst Alison Weir believes there were numerous other affairs. Catherine is not known to have protested. In 1518 she fell pregnant again with another girl, who was also stillborn.

Blount gave birth in June 1519 to Henry's illegitimate son, Henry FitzRoy. The young boy was made Duke of Richmond in June 1525 in what some thought was one step on the path to his eventual legitimisation. In 1533, FitzRoy married Mary Howard, but died childless three years later. At the time of his death in June 1536, Parliament was considering the Second Succession Act, which could have allowed him to become king.

France and the Habsburgs 

In 1510, France, with a fragile alliance with the Holy Roman Empire in the League of Cambrai, was winning a war against Venice. Henry renewed his father's friendship with Louis XII of France, an issue that divided his council. Certainly, war with the combined might of the two powers would have been exceedingly difficult. Shortly thereafter, however, Henry also signed a pact with Ferdinand II of Aragon. After Pope Julius II created the anti-French Holy League in October 1511, Henry followed Ferdinand's lead and brought England into the new League. An initial joint Anglo-Spanish attack was planned for the spring to recover Aquitaine for England, the start of making Henry's dreams of ruling France a reality. The attack, however, following a formal declaration of war in April 1512, was not led by Henry personally and was a considerable failure; Ferdinand used it simply to further his own ends, and it strained the Anglo-Spanish alliance. Nevertheless, the French were pushed out of Italy soon after, and the alliance survived, with both parties keen to win further victories over the French. Henry then pulled off a diplomatic coup by convincing Emperor Maximilian to join the Holy League. Remarkably, Henry had also secured the promised title of "Most Christian King of France" from Julius and possibly coronation by the Pope himself in Paris, if only Louis could be defeated.

On 30 June 1513, Henry invaded France, and his troops defeated a French army at the Battle of the Spurs – a relatively minor result, but one which was seized on by the English for propaganda purposes. Soon after, the English took Thérouanne and handed it over to Maximillian; Tournai, a more significant settlement, followed. Henry had led the army personally, complete with a large entourage. His absence from the country, however, had prompted his brother-in-law James IV of Scotland to invade England at the behest of Louis. Nevertheless, the English army, overseen by Queen Catherine, decisively defeated the Scots at the Battle of Flodden on 9 September 1513. Among the dead was the Scottish king, thus ending Scotland's brief involvement in the war. These campaigns had given Henry a taste of the military success he so desired. However, despite initial indications, he decided not to pursue a 1514 campaign. He had been supporting Ferdinand and Maximilian financially during the campaign but had received little in return; England's coffers were now empty. With the replacement of Julius by Pope Leo X, who was inclined to negotiate for peace with France, Henry signed his own treaty with Louis: his sister Mary would become Louis' wife, having previously been pledged to the younger Charles, and peace was secured for eight years, a remarkably long time.

Charles V, the nephew of Henry's wife Catherine, inherited a large empire in Europe, becoming king of Spain in 1516 and Holy Roman Emperor in 1519. When Louis XII of France died in 1515, he was succeeded by his cousin Francis I. These accessions left three relatively young rulers and an opportunity for a clean slate. The careful diplomacy of Cardinal Thomas Wolsey had resulted in the Treaty of London in 1518, aimed at uniting the kingdoms of western Europe in the wake of a new Ottoman threat, and it seemed that peace might be secured. Henry met the new French king, Francis, on 7 June 1520 at the Field of the Cloth of Gold near Calais for a fortnight of lavish entertainment. Both hoped for friendly relations in place of the wars of the previous decade. The strong air of competition laid to rest any hopes of a renewal of the Treaty of London, however, and conflict was inevitable. Henry had more in common with Charles, whom he met once before and once after Francis. Charles brought his realm into war with France in 1521; Henry offered to mediate, but little was achieved and by the end of the year Henry had aligned England with Charles. He still clung to his previous aim of restoring English lands in France but also sought to secure an alliance with Burgundy, then a territorial possession of Charles, and the continued support of the Emperor. A small English attack in the north of France made up little ground. Charles defeated and captured Francis at Pavia and could dictate peace, but he believed he owed Henry nothing. Sensing this, Henry decided to take England out of the war before his ally, signing the Treaty of the More on 30 August 1525.

Marriages

Annulment from Catherine 

During his marriage to Catherine of Aragon, Henry conducted an affair with Mary Boleyn, Catherine's lady-in-waiting. There has been speculation that Mary's two children, Henry Carey and Catherine Carey, were fathered by Henry, but this has never been proved, and the king never acknowledged them as he did in the case of Henry FitzRoy. In 1525, as Henry grew more impatient with Catherine's inability to produce the male heir he desired, he became enamoured of Mary Boleyn's sister, Anne Boleyn, then a charismatic young woman of 25 in the queen's entourage. Anne, however, resisted his attempts to seduce her, and refused to become his mistress as her sister had. It was in this context that Henry considered his three options for finding a dynastic successor and hence resolving what came to be described at court as the king's "great matter". These options were legitimising Henry FitzRoy, which would need the involvement of the Pope and would be open to challenge; marrying off Mary, his daughter with Catherine, as soon as possible and hoping for a grandson to inherit directly, but Mary was considered unlikely to conceive before Henry's death, or somehow rejecting Catherine and marrying someone else of child-bearing age. Probably seeing the possibility of marrying Anne, the third was ultimately the most attractive possibility to the 34-year-old Henry, and it soon became the king's absorbing desire to annul his marriage to the now 40-year-old Catherine.

Henry's precise motivations and intentions over the coming years are not widely agreed on. Henry himself, at least in the early part of his reign, was a devout and well-informed Catholic to the extent that his 1521 publication Assertio Septem Sacramentorum ("Defence of the Seven Sacraments") earned him the title of Fidei Defensor (Defender of the Faith) from Pope Leo X. The work represented a staunch defence of papal supremacy, albeit one couched in somewhat contingent terms. It is not clear exactly when Henry changed his mind on the issue as he grew more intent on a second marriage. Certainly, by 1527, he had convinced himself that Catherine had produced no male heir because their union was "blighted in the eyes of God". Indeed, in marrying Catherine, his brother's wife, he had acted contrary to Leviticus 20:21, a justification Thomas Cranmer used to declare the marriage null. Martin Luther, on the other hand, had initially argued against the annulment, stating that Henry VIII could take a second wife in accordance with his teaching that the Bible allowed for polygamy but not divorce. Henry now believed the Pope had lacked the authority to grant a dispensation from this impediment. It was this argument Henry took to Pope Clement VII in 1527 in the hope of having his marriage to Catherine annulled, forgoing at least one less openly defiant line of attack. In going public, all hope of tempting Catherine to retire to a nunnery or otherwise stay quiet was lost. Henry sent his secretary, William Knight, to appeal directly to the Holy See by way of a deceptively worded draft papal bull. Knight was unsuccessful; the Pope could not be misled so easily.

Other missions concentrated on arranging an ecclesiastical court to meet in England, with a representative from Clement VII. Although Clement agreed to the creation of such a court, he never had any intention of empowering his legate, Lorenzo Campeggio, to decide in Henry's favour. This bias was perhaps the result of pressure from Emperor Charles V, Catherine's nephew, but it is not clear how far this influenced either Campeggio or the Pope. After less than two months of hearing evidence, Clement called the case back to Rome in July 1529, from which it was clear that it would never re-emerge. With the chance for an annulment lost, Cardinal Wolsey bore the blame. He was charged with praemunire in October 1529, and his fall from grace was "sudden and total". Briefly reconciled with Henry (and officially pardoned) in the first half of 1530, he was charged once more in November 1530, this time for treason, but died while awaiting trial. After a short period in which Henry took government upon his own shoulders, Sir Thomas More took on the role of Lord Chancellor and chief minister. Intelligent and able, but also a devout Catholic and opponent of the annulment, More initially cooperated with the king's new policy, denouncing Wolsey in Parliament.

A year later, Catherine was banished from court, and her rooms were given to Anne Boleyn. Anne was an unusually educated and intellectual woman for her time and was keenly absorbed and engaged with the ideas of the Protestant Reformers, but the extent to which she herself was a committed Protestant is much debated. When Archbishop of Canterbury William Warham died, Anne's influence and the need to find a trustworthy supporter of the annulment had Thomas Cranmer appointed to the vacant position. This was approved by the Pope, unaware of the king's nascent plans for the Church.

Henry was married to Catherine for 24 years. Their divorce has been described as a "deeply wounding and isolating" experience for Henry.

Marriage to Anne Boleyn 

In the winter of 1532, Henry met with Francis I at Calais and enlisted the support of the French king for his new marriage. Immediately upon returning to Dover in England, Henry, now 41, and Anne went through a secret wedding service. She soon became pregnant, and there was a second wedding service in London on 25 January 1533. On 23 May 1533, Cranmer, sitting in judgment at a special court convened at Dunstable Priory to rule on the validity of the king's marriage to Catherine of Aragon, declared the marriage of Henry and Catherine null and void. Five days later, on 28 May 1533, Cranmer declared the marriage of Henry and Anne to be valid. Catherine was formally stripped of her title as queen, becoming instead "princess dowager" as the widow of Arthur. In her place, Anne was crowned queen consort on 1 June 1533. The queen gave birth to a daughter slightly prematurely on 7 September 1533. The child was christened Elizabeth, in honour of Henry's mother, Elizabeth of York.

Following the marriage, there was a period of consolidation, taking the form of a series of statutes of the Reformation Parliament aimed at finding solutions to any remaining issues, whilst protecting the new reforms from challenge, convincing the public of their legitimacy, and exposing and dealing with opponents. Although the canon law was dealt with at length by Cranmer and others, these acts were advanced by Thomas Cromwell, Thomas Audley and the Duke of Norfolk and indeed by Henry himself. With this process complete, in May 1532 More resigned as Lord Chancellor, leaving Cromwell as Henry's chief minister. With the Act of Succession 1533, Catherine's daughter, Mary, was declared illegitimate; Henry's marriage to Anne was declared legitimate; and Anne's issue declared to be next in the line of succession. With the Acts of Supremacy in 1534, Parliament also recognised the king's status as head of the church in England and, together with the Act in Restraint of Appeals in 1532, abolished the right of appeal to Rome. It was only then that Pope Clement VII took the step of excommunicating the king and Cranmer, although the excommunication was not made official until some time later.

The king and queen were not pleased with married life. The royal couple enjoyed periods of calm and affection, but Anne refused to play the submissive role expected of her. The vivacity and opinionated intellect that had made her so attractive as an illicit lover made her too independent for the largely ceremonial role of a royal wife and it made her many enemies. For his part, Henry disliked Anne's constant irritability and violent temper. After a false pregnancy or miscarriage in 1534, he saw her failure to give him a son as a betrayal. As early as Christmas 1534, Henry was discussing with Cranmer and Cromwell the chances of leaving Anne without having to return to Catherine. Henry is traditionally believed to have had an affair with Madge Shelton in 1535, although historian Antonia Fraser argues that Henry in fact had an affair with her sister Mary Shelton.

Opposition to Henry's religious policies was at first quickly suppressed in England. A number of dissenting monks, including the first Carthusian Martyrs, were executed and many more pilloried. The most prominent resisters included John Fisher, Bishop of Rochester, and Sir Thomas More, both of whom refused to take the oath to the king. Neither Henry nor Cromwell sought at that stage to have the men executed; rather, they hoped that the two might change their minds and save themselves. Fisher openly rejected Henry as the Supreme Head of the Church, but More was careful to avoid openly breaking the Treasons Act of 1534, which (unlike later acts) did not forbid mere silence. Both men were subsequently convicted of high treason, however – More on the evidence of a single conversation with Richard Rich, the Solicitor General, and both were executed in the summer of 1535.

These suppressions, as well as the Dissolution of the Lesser Monasteries Act of 1536, in turn contributed to more general resistance to Henry's reforms, most notably in the Pilgrimage of Grace, a large uprising in northern England in October 1536. Some 20,000 to 40,000 rebels were led by Robert Aske, together with parts of the northern nobility. Henry VIII promised the rebels he would pardon them and thanked them for raising the issues. Aske told the rebels they had been successful and they could disperse and go home. Henry saw the rebels as traitors and did not feel obliged to keep his promises to them, so when further violence occurred after Henry's offer of a pardon he was quick to break his promise of clemency. The leaders, including Aske, were arrested and executed for treason. In total, about 200 rebels were executed, and the disturbances ended.

Execution of Anne Boleyn 

On 8 January 1536, news reached the king and queen that Catherine of Aragon had died. The following day, Henry dressed all in yellow, with a white feather in his bonnet. Queen Anne was pregnant again, and she was aware of the consequences if she failed to give birth to a son. Later that month, the king was thrown from his horse in a tournament and was badly injured; it seemed for a time that his life was in danger. When news of this accident reached the queen, she was sent into shock and miscarried a male child at about 15 weeks' gestation, on the day of Catherine's funeral, 29 January 1536. For most observers, this personal loss was the beginning of the end of this royal marriage.

Although the Boleyn family still held important positions on the Privy Council, Anne had many enemies, including the Duke of Suffolk. Even her own uncle, the Duke of Norfolk, had come to resent her attitude to her power. The Boleyns preferred France over the Emperor as a potential ally, but the king's favour had swung towards the latter (partly because of Cromwell), damaging the family's influence. Also opposed to Anne were supporters of reconciliation with Princess Mary (among them the former supporters of Catherine), who had reached maturity. A second annulment was now a real possibility, although it is commonly believed that it was Cromwell's anti-Boleyn influence that led opponents to look for a way of having her executed.

Anne's downfall came shortly after she had recovered from her final miscarriage. Whether it was primarily the result of allegations of conspiracy, adultery, or witchcraft remains a matter of debate among historians. Early signs of a fall from grace included the king's new mistress, the 28-year-old Jane Seymour, being moved into new quarters, and Anne's brother, George Boleyn, being refused the Order of the Garter, which was instead given to Nicholas Carew. Between 30 April and 2 May, five men, including George Boleyn, were arrested on charges of treasonable adultery and accused of having sexual relationships with the queen. Anne was also arrested, accused of treasonous adultery and incest. Although the evidence against them was unconvincing, the accused were found guilty and condemned to death. The accused men were executed on 17 May 1536. Henry and Anne's marriage was annulled by Archbishop Cranmer at Lambeth on the same day. Cranmer appears to have had difficulty finding grounds for an annulment and probably based it on the prior liaison between Henry and Anne's sister Mary, which in canon law meant that Henry's marriage to Anne was, like his first marriage, within a forbidden degree of affinity and therefore void. At 8 am on 19 May 1536, Anne was executed on Tower Green.

Marriage to Jane Seymour; domestic and foreign affairs 

The day after Anne's execution the 45-year-old Henry became engaged to Seymour, who had been one of the queen's ladies-in-waiting. They were married ten days later at the Palace of Whitehall, Whitehall, London, in the queen's closet, by Stephen Gardiner, Bishop of Winchester. On 12 October 1537, Jane gave birth to a son, Prince Edward, the future Edward VI. The birth was difficult, and Queen Jane died on 24 October 1537 from an infection and was buried in Windsor. The euphoria that had accompanied Edward's birth became sorrow, but it was only over time that Henry came to long for his wife. At the time, Henry recovered quickly from the shock. Measures were immediately put in place to find another wife for Henry, which, at the insistence of Cromwell and the Privy Council, were focused on the European continent.

With Charles V distracted by the internal politics of his many kingdoms and also external threats, and Henry and Francis on relatively good terms, domestic and not foreign policy issues had been Henry's priority in the first half of the 1530s. In 1536, for example, Henry granted his assent to the Laws in Wales Act 1535, which legally annexed Wales, uniting England and Wales into a single nation. This was followed by the Second Succession Act (the Act of Succession 1536), which declared Henry's children by Jane to be next in the line of succession and declared both Mary and Elizabeth illegitimate, thus excluding them from the throne. The king was also granted the power to further determine the line of succession in his will, should he have no further issue.

In 1538, as part of the negotiation of a secret treaty by Cromwell with Charles V, a series of dynastic marriages were proposed: Mary would marry a son of the King of Portugal, Elizabeth marry one of the sons of the King of Hungary and the infant Edward marry one of the Emperor's daughters. The widowed King, it was suggested, might marry the Dowager Duchess of Milan. However, when Charles and Francis made peace in January 1539, Henry became increasingly paranoid, perhaps as a result of receiving a constant list of threats to the kingdom (real or imaginary, minor or serious) supplied by Cromwell in his role as spymaster. Enriched by the dissolution of the monasteries, Henry used some of his financial reserves to build a series of coastal defences and set some aside for use in the event of a Franco-German invasion.

Marriage to Anne of Cleves 

Having considered the matter, Cromwell suggested Anne, the 25-year-old sister of the Duke of Cleves, who was seen as an important ally in case of a Roman Catholic attack on England, for the duke fell between Lutheranism and Catholicism. Hans Holbein the Younger was dispatched to Cleves to paint a portrait of Anne for the king. Despite speculation that Holbein painted her in an overly flattering light, it is more likely that the portrait was accurate; Holbein remained in favour at court. After seeing Holbein's portrait, and urged on by the complimentary description of Anne given by his courtiers, the 49-year-old king agreed to wed Anne. The marriage took place in January 1540.

However, it was not long before Henry wished to annul the marriage so he could marry another. Anne did not argue, and confirmed that the marriage had never been consummated. Anne's previous betrothal to the Duke of Lorraine's son Francis provided further grounds for the annulment. The marriage was subsequently dissolved in July 1540, and Anne received the title of "The King's Sister", two houses, and a generous allowance. It was soon clear that Henry had fallen for the 17-year-old Catherine Howard, the Duke of Norfolk's niece. This worried Cromwell, for Norfolk was his political opponent.

Shortly after, the religious reformers (and protégés of Cromwell) Robert Barnes, William Jerome and Thomas Garret were burned as heretics. Cromwell, meanwhile, fell out of favour although it is unclear exactly why, for there is little evidence of differences in domestic or foreign policy. Despite his role, he was never formally accused of being responsible for Henry's failed marriage. Cromwell was now surrounded by enemies at court, with Norfolk also able to draw on his niece Catherine's position. Cromwell was charged with treason, selling export licences, granting passports, and drawing up commissions without permission, and may also have been blamed for the failure of the foreign policy that accompanied the attempted marriage to Anne. He was subsequently attainted and beheaded.

Marriage to Catherine Howard 

On 28 July 1540 (the same day Cromwell was executed), Henry married the young Catherine Howard, a first cousin and lady-in-waiting of Anne Boleyn. He was delighted with his new queen and awarded her the lands of Cromwell and a vast array of jewellery. Soon after the marriage, however, Queen Catherine had an affair with the courtier Thomas Culpeper. She also employed Francis Dereham, who had previously been informally engaged to her and had an affair with her prior to her marriage, as her secretary. The Privy Council was informed of her affair with Dereham whilst Henry was away; Thomas Cranmer was dispatched to investigate, and he brought evidence of Queen Catherine's previous affair with Dereham to the king's notice. Though Henry originally refused to believe the allegations, Dereham confessed. It took another meeting of the council, however, before Henry believed the accusations against Dereham and went into a rage, blaming the council before consoling himself in hunting. When questioned, the queen could have admitted a prior contract to marry Dereham, which would have made her subsequent marriage to Henry invalid, but she instead claimed that Dereham had forced her to enter into an adulterous relationship. Dereham, meanwhile, exposed Catherine's relationship with Culpeper. Culpeper and Dereham were both executed, and Catherine too was beheaded on 13 February 1542.

Marriage to Catherine Parr 

Henry married his last wife, the wealthy widow Catherine Parr, in July 1543. A reformer at heart, she argued with Henry over religion. Henry remained committed to an idiosyncratic mixture of Catholicism and Protestantism; the reactionary mood that had gained ground after Cromwell's fall had neither eliminated his Protestant streak nor been overcome by it. Parr helped reconcile Henry with his daughters, Mary and Elizabeth. In 1543, the Third Succession Act put them back in the line of succession after Edward. The same act allowed Henry to determine further succession to the throne in his will.

Shrines destroyed and monasteries dissolved 

In 1538, the chief minister Thomas Cromwell pursued an extensive campaign against what the government termed "idolatry" practised under the old religion, culminating in September with the dismantling of the shrine of St. Thomas Becket at Canterbury Cathedral. As a consequence, the king was excommunicated by Pope Paul III on 17 December of the same year. In 1540, Henry sanctioned the complete destruction of shrines to saints. In 1542, England's remaining monasteries were all dissolved, and their property transferred to the Crown. Abbots and priors lost their seats in the House of Lords; only archbishops and bishops remained. Consequently, the Lords Spiritualas members of the clergy with seats in the House of Lords were knownwere for the first time outnumbered by the Lords Temporal.

Second invasion of France and the "Rough Wooing" of Scotland 

The 1539 alliance between Francis and Charles had soured, eventually degenerating into renewed war. With Catherine of Aragon and Anne Boleyn dead, relations between Charles and Henry improved considerably, and Henry concluded a secret alliance with the Emperor and decided to enter the Italian War in favour of his new ally. An invasion of France was planned for 1543. In preparation for it, Henry moved to eliminate the potential threat of Scotland under the youthful James V. The Scots were defeated at Battle of Solway Moss on 24 November 1542, and James died on 15 December. Henry now hoped to unite the crowns of England and Scotland by marrying his son Edward to James's successor, Mary. The Scottish Regent Lord Arran agreed to the marriage in the Treaty of Greenwich on 1 July 1543, but it was rejected by the Parliament of Scotland on 11 December. The result was eight years of war between England and Scotland, a campaign later dubbed "the Rough Wooing". Despite several peace treaties, unrest continued in Scotland until Henry's death.

Despite the early success with Scotland, Henry hesitated to invade France, annoying Charles. Henry finally went to France in June 1544 with a two-pronged attack. One force under Norfolk ineffectively besieged Montreuil. The other, under Suffolk, laid siege to Boulogne. Henry later took personal command, and Boulogne fell on 18 September 1544. However, Henry had refused Charles's request to march against Paris. Charles's own campaign fizzled, and he made peace with France that same day. Henry was left alone against France, unable to make peace. Francis attempted to invade England in the summer of 1545 but his forces reached only the Isle of Wight before being repulsed in the Battle of the Solent. Financially exhausted, France and England signed the Treaty of Camp on 7 June 1546. Henry secured Boulogne for eight years. The city was then to be returned to France for 2 million crowns (£750,000). Henry needed the money; the 1544 campaign had cost £650,000, and England was once again facing bankruptcy.

Physical decline and death 

He was covered with painful, pus-filled boils and possibly suffered from gout. His obesity and other medical problems can be traced to the jousting accident in 1536 in which he suffered a leg wound. The accident reopened and aggravated an injury he had sustained years earlier, to the extent that his doctors found it difficult to treat. The chronic wound festered for the remainder of his life and became ulcerated, preventing him from maintaining the level of physical activity he had previously enjoyed. The jousting accident is also believed to have caused Henry's mood swings, which may have had a dramatic effect on his personality and temperament.

The theory that Henry suffered from syphilis has been dismissed by most historians. Historian Susan Maclean Kybett ascribes his demise to scurvy, which is caused by insufficient vitamin C most often due to a lack of fresh fruit and vegetables in one's diet. Alternatively, his wives' pattern of pregnancies and his mental deterioration have led some to suggest that he may have been Kell positive and suffered from McLeod syndrome. According to another study, Henry's history and body morphology may have been the result of traumatic brain injury after his 1536 jousting accident, which in turn led to a neuroendocrine cause of his obesity. This analysis identifies growth hormone deficiency (GHD) as the reason for his increased adiposity but also significant behavioural changes noted in his later years, including his multiple marriages.

Henry's obesity hastened his death at the age of 55, on 28 January 1547 in the Palace of Whitehall, on what would have been his father's 90th birthday. The tomb he had planned (with components taken from the tomb intended for Cardinal Wolsey) was only partly constructed and was never completed (the sarcophagus and its base were later removed and used for Lord Nelson's tomb in the crypt of St. Paul's Cathedral). Henry was interred in a vault at St George's Chapel, Windsor Castle, next to Jane Seymour. Over 100 years later, King Charles I (ruled 1625–1649) was buried in the same vault.

Wives, mistresses, and children 
English historian and House of Tudor expert David Starkey describes Henry VIII as a husband:What is extraordinary is that Henry was usually a very good husband. And he liked womenthat's why he married so many of them! He was very tender to them, we know that he addressed them as "sweetheart." He was a good lover, he was very generous: the wives were given huge settlements of land and jewelsthey were loaded with jewels. He was immensely considerate when they were pregnant. But, once he had fallen out of love... he just cut them off. He just withdrew. He abandoned them. They didn't even know he'd left them.

Succession 

Upon Henry's death, he was succeeded by his only surviving son, Edward VI. Since Edward was then only nine years old, he could not rule directly. Instead, Henry's will designated 16 executors to serve on a regency council until Edward reached 18. The executors chose Edward Seymour, 1st Earl of Hertford, elder brother to Jane Seymour (Edward's mother), to be Lord Protector of the Realm. Under provisions of the will, were Edward to die childless, the throne was to pass to Mary, Henry VIII's daughter by Catherine of Aragon, and her heirs.

If Mary's issue failed, the crown was to go to Elizabeth, Henry's daughter by Anne Boleyn, and her heirs. Finally, if Elizabeth's line became extinct, the crown was to be inherited by the descendants of Henry VIII's deceased younger sister, Mary, the Greys.

The descendants of Henry's sister Margaret Tudorthe Stuarts, rulers of Scotlandwere thereby excluded from the succession.

This provision ultimately failed when James VI of Scotland became King of England in 1603.

Edward VI himself would disregard the will and name Jane Grey his successor.

Public image 

Henry cultivated the image of a Renaissance man, and his court was a centre of scholarly and artistic innovation and glamorous excess, epitomised by the Field of the Cloth of Gold. He scouted the country for choirboys, taking some directly from Wolsey's choir, and introduced Renaissance music into court. Musicians included Benedict de Opitiis, Richard Sampson, Ambrose Lupo, and Venetian organist Dionisio Memo, and Henry himself kept a considerable collection of instruments. He was skilled on the lute and played the organ, and was a talented player of the virginals. He could also sightread music and sing well. He was an accomplished musician, author, and poet; his best-known piece of music is "Pastime with Good Company" ("The Kynges Ballade"), and he is reputed to have written "Greensleeves" but probably did not.

Henry was an avid gambler and dice player, and excelled at sports, especially jousting, hunting, and real tennis. He was also known for his strong defence of conventional Christian piety. He was involved in the construction and improvement of several significant buildings, including Nonsuch Palace, King's College Chapel, Cambridge, and Westminster Abbey in London. Many of the existing buildings which he improved were properties confiscated from Wolsey, such as Christ Church, Oxford, Hampton Court Palace, the Palace of Whitehall, and Trinity College, Cambridge.

Henry was an intellectual, the first English king with a modern humanist education. He read and wrote English, French, and Latin, and owned a large library. He annotated many books and published one of his own, and he had numerous pamphlets and lectures prepared to support the reformation of the church. Richard Sampson's Oratio (1534), for example, was an argument for absolute obedience to the monarchy and claimed that the English church had always been independent of Rome. At the popular level, theatre and minstrel troupes funded by the crown travelled around the land to promote the new religious practices; the pope and Catholic priests and monks were mocked as foreign devils, while Henry was hailed as the glorious king of England and as a brave and heroic defender of the true faith. Henry worked hard to present an image of unchallengeable authority and irresistible power.

His athletic activities were more than pastimes; they were political devices that served multiple goals, enhancing his image, impressing foreign emissaries and rulers, and conveying his ability to suppress any rebellion. He arranged a jousting tournament at Greenwich in 1517 where he wore gilded armour and gilded horse trappings, and outfits of velvet, satin, and cloth of gold with pearls and jewels. It suitably impressed foreign ambassadors, one of whom wrote home that "the wealth and civilisation of the world are here, and those who call the English barbarians appear to me to render themselves such". Henry finally retired from jousting in 1536 after a heavy fall from his horse left him unconscious for two hours, but he continued to sponsor two lavish tournaments a year. He then started gaining weight and lost the trim, athletic figure that had made him so handsome, and his courtiers began dressing in heavily padded clothes to emulate and flatter him. His health rapidly declined near the end of his reign.

Government 
The power of Tudor monarchs, including Henry, was 'whole' and 'entire', ruling, as they claimed, by the grace of God alone. The crown could also rely on the exclusive use of those functions that constituted the royal prerogative. These included acts of diplomacy (including royal marriages), declarations of war, management of the coinage, the issue of royal pardons and the power to summon and dissolve parliament as and when required. Nevertheless, as evident during Henry's break with Rome, the monarch stayed within established limits, whether legal or financial, that forced him to work closely with both the nobility and parliament (representing the gentry).

In practice, Tudor monarchs used patronage to maintain a royal court that included formal institutions such as the Privy Council as well as more informal advisers and confidants. Both the rise and fall of court nobles could be swift: Henry did undoubtedly execute at will, burning or beheading two of his wives, 20 peers, four leading public servants, six close attendants and friends, one cardinal (John Fisher) and numerous abbots. Among those who were in favour at any given point in Henry's reign, one could usually be identified as a chief minister, though one of the enduring debates in the historiography of the period has been the extent to which those chief ministers controlled Henry rather than vice versa. In particular, historian G. R. Elton has argued that one such minister, Thomas Cromwell, led a "Tudor revolution in government" independently of the king, whom Elton presented as an opportunistic, essentially lazy participant in the nitty-gritty of politics. Where Henry did intervene personally in the running of the country, Elton argued, he mostly did so to its detriment. The prominence and influence of faction in Henry's court is similarly discussed in the context of at least five episodes of Henry's reign, including the downfall of Anne Boleyn.

From 1514 to 1529, Thomas Wolsey (1473–1530), a cardinal of the established Church, oversaw domestic and foreign policy for the king from his position as Lord Chancellor. Wolsey centralised the national government and extended the jurisdiction of the conciliar courts, particularly the Star Chamber. The Star Chamber's overall structure remained unchanged, but Wolsey used it to provide much-needed reform of the criminal law. The power of the court itself did not outlive Wolsey, however, since no serious administrative reform was undertaken and its role eventually devolved to the localities. Wolsey helped fill the gap left by Henry's declining participation in government (particularly in comparison to his father) but did so mostly by imposing himself in the king's place. His use of these courts to pursue personal grievances, and particularly to treat delinquents as mere examples of a whole class worthy of punishment, angered the rich, who were annoyed as well by his enormous wealth and ostentatious living. Following Wolsey's downfall, Henry took full control of his government, although at court numerous complex factions continued to try to ruin and destroy each other.

Thomas Cromwell (c. 1485 – 1540) also came to define Henry's government. Returning to England from the continent in 1514 or 1515, Cromwell soon entered Wolsey's service. He turned to law, also picking up a good knowledge of the Bible, and was admitted to Gray's Inn in 1524. He became Wolsey's "man of all work". Driven in part by his religious beliefs, Cromwell attempted to reform the body politic of the English government through discussion and consent, and through the vehicle of continuity, not outward change. Many saw him as the man they wanted to bring about their shared aims, including Thomas Audley. By 1531, Cromwell and his associates were already responsible for the drafting of much legislation. Cromwell's first office was that of the master of the king's jewels in 1532, from which he began to invigorate the government finances. By that point, Cromwell's power as an efficient administrator, in a Council full of politicians, exceeded what Wolsey had achieved.

Cromwell did much work through his many offices to remove the tasks of government from the Royal Household (and ideologically from the personal body of the king) and into a public state. But he did so in a haphazard fashion that left several remnants, not least because he needed to retain Henry's support, his own power, and the possibility of actually achieving the plan he set out. Cromwell made the various income streams Henry VII put in place more formal and assigned largely autonomous bodies for their administration. The role of the King's Council was transferred to a reformed Privy Council, much smaller and more efficient than its predecessor. A difference emerged between the king's financial health and the country's, although Cromwell's fall undermined much of his bureaucracy, which required him to keep order among the many new bodies and prevent profligate spending that strained relations as well as finances. Cromwell's reforms ground to a halt in 1539, the initiative lost, and he failed to secure the passage of an enabling act, the Proclamation by the Crown Act 1539. He was executed on 28 July 1540.

Finances 

Henry inherited a vast fortune and a prosperous economy from his father, who had been frugal. This fortune is estimated at £1,250,000 (the equivalent of £375 million today). By comparison, Henry VIII's reign was a near disaster financially. He augmented the royal treasury by seizing church lands, but his heavy spending and long periods of mismanagement damaged the economy.

Henry spent much of his wealth on maintaining his court and household, including many of the building works he undertook on royal palaces. He hung 2,000 tapestries in his palaces; by comparison, James V of Scotland hung just 200. Henry took pride in showing off his collection of weapons, which included exotic archery equipment, 2,250 pieces of land ordnance and 6,500 handguns. Tudor monarchs had to fund all government expenses out of their own income. This income came from the Crown lands that Henry owned as well as from customs duties like tonnage and poundage, granted by parliament to the king for life. During Henry's reign the revenues of the Crown remained constant (around £100,000), but were eroded by inflation and rising prices brought about by war. Indeed, war and Henry's dynastic ambitions in Europe exhausted the surplus he had inherited from his father by the mid-1520s.

Henry VII had not involved Parliament in his affairs very much, but Henry VIII had to turn to Parliament during his reign for money, in particular for grants of subsidies to fund his wars. The dissolution of the monasteries provided a means to replenish the treasury, and as a result, the Crown took possession of monastic lands worth £120,000 (£36 million) a year. The Crown had profited by a small amount in 1526 when Wolsey put England onto a gold, rather than silver, standard, and had debased the currency slightly. Cromwell debased the currency more significantly, starting in Ireland in 1540. The English pound halved in value against the Flemish pound between 1540 and 1551 as a result. The nominal profit made was significant, helping to bring income and expenditure together, but it had a catastrophic effect on the country's economy. In part, it helped to bring about a period of very high inflation from 1544 onwards.

Reformation 

Henry is generally credited with initiating the English Reformationthe process of transforming England from a Catholic country to a Protestant onethough his progress at the elite and mass levels is disputed, and the precise narrative not widely agreed upon. Certainly, in 1527, Henry, until then an observant and well-informed Catholic, appealed to the Pope for an annulment of his marriage to Catherine. No annulment was immediately forthcoming, since the papacy was now under the control of Charles V, Catherine' s nephew. The traditional narrative gives this refusal as the trigger for Henry's rejection of papal supremacy, which he had previously defended. Yet as E. L. Woodward put it, Henry's determination to annul his marriage with Catherine was the occasion rather than the cause of the English Reformation so that "neither too much nor too little" should be made of the annulment. Historian A. F. Pollard has argued that even if Henry had not needed an annulment, he might have come to reject papal control over the governance of England purely for political reasons. Indeed, Henry needed a son to secure the Tudor Dynasty and avert the risk of civil war over disputed succession.

In any case, between 1532 and 1537, Henry instituted a number of statutes that dealt with the relationship between king and pope and hence the structure of the nascent Church of England. These included the Statute in Restraint of Appeals (passed 1533), which extended the charge of praemunire against all who introduced papal bulls into England, potentially exposing them to the death penalty if found guilty. Other acts included the Supplication against the Ordinaries and the Submission of the Clergy, which recognised Royal Supremacy over the church. The Ecclesiastical Appointments Act 1534 required the clergy to elect bishops nominated by the Sovereign. The Act of Supremacy in 1534 declared that the king was "the only Supreme Head on Earth of the Church of England" and the Treasons Act 1534 made it high treason, punishable by death, to refuse the Oath of Supremacy acknowledging the king as such. Similarly, following the passage of the Act of Succession 1533, all adults in the kingdom were required to acknowledge the Act's provisions (declaring Henry's marriage to Anne legitimate and his marriage to Catherine illegitimate) by oath; those who refused were subject to imprisonment for life, and any publisher or printer of any literature alleging that the marriage to Anne was invalid subject to the death penalty. Finally, the Peter's Pence Act was passed, and it reiterated that England had "no superior under God, but only your Grace" and that Henry's "imperial crown" had been diminished by "the unreasonable and uncharitable usurpations and exactions" of the Pope. The king had much support from the Church under Cranmer.

To Cromwell's annoyance, Henry insisted on parliamentary time to discuss questions of faith, which he achieved through the Duke of Norfolk. This led to the passing of the Act of Six Articles, whereby six major questions were all answered by asserting the religious orthodoxy, thus restraining the reform movement in England. It was followed by the beginnings of a reformed liturgy and of the Book of Common Prayer, which would take until 1549 to complete. But this victory for religious conservatives did not convert into much change in personnel, and Cranmer remained in his position. Overall, the rest of Henry's reign saw a subtle movement away from religious orthodoxy, helped in part by the deaths of prominent figures from before the break with Rome, especially the executions of Thomas More and John Fisher in 1535 for refusing to renounce papal authority. Henry established a new political theology of obedience to the crown that continued for the next decade. It reflected Martin Luther's new interpretation of the fourth commandment ("Honour thy father and mother"), brought to England by William Tyndale. The founding of royal authority on the Ten Commandments was another important shift: reformers within the Church used the Commandments' emphasis on faith and the word of God, while conservatives emphasised the need for dedication to God and doing good. The reformers' efforts lay behind the publication of the Great Bible in 1539 in English. Protestant Reformers still faced persecution, particularly over objections to Henry's annulment. Many fled abroad, including the influential Tyndale, who was eventually executed and his body burned at Henry's behest.

When taxes once payable to Rome were transferred to the Crown, Cromwell saw the need to assess the taxable value of the Church's extensive holdings as they stood in 1535. The result was an extensive compendium, the Valor Ecclesiasticus. In September 1535, Cromwell commissioned a more general visitation of religious institutions, to be undertaken by four appointee visitors. The visitation focussed almost exclusively on the country's religious houses, with largely negative conclusions. In addition to reporting back to Cromwell, the visitors made the lives of the monks more difficult by enforcing strict behavioural standards. The result was to encourage self-dissolution. In any case, the evidence Cromwell gathered led swiftly to the beginning of the state-enforced dissolution of the monasteries, with all religious houses worth less than £200 vested by statute in the crown in January 1536. After a short pause, surviving religious houses were transferred one by one to the Crown and new owners, and the dissolution confirmed by a further statute in 1539. By January 1540 no such houses remained; 800 had been dissolved. The process had been efficient, with minimal resistance, and brought the crown some £90,000 a year. The extent to which the dissolution of all houses was planned from the start is debated by historians; there is some evidence that major houses were originally intended only to be reformed. Cromwell's actions transferred a fifth of England's landed wealth to new hands. The programme was designed primarily to create a landed gentry beholden to the crown, which would use the lands much more efficiently. Although little opposition to the supremacy could be found in England's religious houses, they had links to the international church and were an obstacle to further religious reform.

Response to the reforms was mixed. The religious houses had been the only support of the impoverished, and the reforms alienated much of the populace outside London, helping to provoke the great northern rising of 1536–37, known as the Pilgrimage of Grace. Elsewhere the changes were accepted and welcomed, and those who clung to Catholic rites kept quiet or moved in secrecy. They reemerged during the reign of Henry's daughter Mary (1553–58).

Military 

Apart from permanent garrisons at Berwick, Calais, and Carlisle, England's standing army numbered only a few hundred men. This was increased only slightly by Henry. Henry's invasion force of 1513, some 30,000 men, was composed of billmen and longbowmen, at a time when the other European nations were moving to hand guns and pikemen but the difference in capability was at this stage not significant, and Henry's forces had new armour and weaponry. They were also supported by battlefield artillery and the war wagon, relatively new innovations, and several large and expensive siege guns. The invasion force of 1544 was similarly well-equipped and organised, although command on the battlefield was laid with the dukes of Suffolk and Norfolk, which in the latter case produced disastrous results at Montreuil.

Henry's break with Rome incurred the threat of a large-scale French or Spanish invasion. To guard against this, in 1538 he began to build a chain of expensive, state-of-the-art defences along Britain's southern and eastern coasts, from Kent to Cornwall, largely built of material gained from the demolition of the monasteries. These were known as Henry VIII's Device Forts. He also strengthened existing coastal defence fortresses such as Dover Castle and, at Dover, Moat Bulwark and Archcliffe Fort, which he visited for a few months to supervise. Wolsey had many years before conducted the censuses required for an overhaul of the system of militia, but no reform resulted. In 1538–39, Cromwell overhauled the shire musters, but his work mainly served to demonstrate how inadequate they were in organisation. The building works, including that at Berwick, along with the reform of the militias and musters, were eventually finished under Queen Mary.

Henry is traditionally cited as one of the founders of the Royal Navy. Technologically, Henry invested in large cannon for his warships, an idea that had taken hold in other countries, to replace the smaller serpentines in use. He also flirted with designing ships personally. His contribution to larger vessels, if any, is unknown, but it is believed that he influenced the design of rowbarges and similar galleys. Henry was also responsible for the creation of a permanent navy, with the supporting anchorages and dockyards. Tactically, Henry's reign saw the Navy move away from boarding tactics to employ gunnery instead. The Tudor navy was enlarged up to 50 ships (the Mary Rose among them), and Henry was responsible for the establishment of the "council for marine causes" to oversee the maintenance and operation of the Navy, becoming the basis for the later Admiralty.

Ireland 

At the beginning of Henry's reign, Ireland was effectively divided into three zones: the Pale, where English rule was unchallenged; Leinster and Munster, the so-called "obedient land" of Anglo-Irish peers; and the Gaelic Connaught and Ulster, with merely nominal English rule. Until 1513, Henry continued the policy of his father, to allow Irish lords to rule in the king's name and accept steep divisions between the communities. However, upon the death of the 8th Earl of Kildare, governor of Ireland, fractious Irish politics combined with a more ambitious Henry to cause trouble. When Thomas Butler, 7th Earl of Ormond, died, Henry recognised one successor for Ormond's English, Welsh and Scottish lands, whilst in Ireland another took control. Kildare's successor, the 9th Earl, was replaced as Lord Lieutenant of Ireland by the Earl of Surrey in 1520. Surrey's ambitious aims were costly but ineffective; English rule became trapped between winning the Irish lords over with diplomacy, as favoured by Henry and Wolsey, and a sweeping military occupation as proposed by Surrey. Surrey was recalled in 1521, with Piers Butler – one of the claimants to the Earldom of Ormond – appointed in his place. Butler proved unable to control opposition, including that of Kildare. Kildare was appointed chief governor in 1524, resuming his dispute with Butler, which had before been in a lull. Meanwhile, the Earl of Desmond, an Anglo-Irish peer, had turned his support to Richard de la Pole as pretender to the English throne; when in 1528 Kildare failed to take suitable actions against him, Kildare was once again removed from his post.

The Desmond situation was resolved on his death in 1529, which was followed by a period of uncertainty. This was effectively ended with the appointment of Henry FitzRoy, Duke of Richmond and the king's son, as lord lieutenant. Richmond had never before visited Ireland, his appointment a break with past policy. For a time it looked as if peace might be restored with the return of Kildare to Ireland to manage the tribes, but the effect was limited and the Irish parliament soon rendered ineffective. Ireland began to receive the attention of Cromwell, who had supporters of Ormond and Desmond promoted. Kildare, on the other hand, was summoned to London; after some hesitation, he departed for London in 1534, where he would face charges of treason. His son, Thomas, Lord Offaly, was more forthright, denouncing the king and leading a "Catholic crusade" against the king, who was by this time mired in marital problems. Offaly had the Archbishop of Dublin murdered and besieged Dublin. Offaly led a mixture of Pale gentry and Irish tribes, although he failed to secure the support of Lord Darcy, a sympathiser, or Charles V. What was effectively a civil war was ended with the intervention of 2,000 English troops – a large army by Irish standards – and the execution of Offaly (his father was already dead) and his uncles.

Although the Offaly revolt was followed by a determination to rule Ireland more closely, Henry was wary of drawn-out conflict with the tribes, and a royal commission recommended that the only relationship with the tribes was to be promises of peace, their land protected from English expansion. The man to lead this effort was Sir Antony St Leger, as Lord Deputy of Ireland, who would remain into the post past Henry's death. Until the break with Rome, it was widely believed that Ireland was a Papal possession granted as a mere fiefdom to the English king, so in 1541 Henry asserted England's claim to the Kingdom of Ireland free from the Papal overlordship. This change did, however, also allow a policy of peaceful reconciliation and expansion: the Lords of Ireland would grant their lands to the king, before being returned as fiefdoms. The incentive to comply with Henry's request was an accompanying barony, and thus a right to sit in the Irish House of Lords, which was to run in parallel with England's. The Irish law of the tribes did not suit such an arrangement, because the chieftain did not have the required rights; this made progress tortuous, and the plan was abandoned in 1543, not to be replaced.

Historiography 
The complexities and sheer scale of Henry's legacy ensured that, in the words of Betteridge and Freeman, "throughout the centuries, Henry has been praised and reviled, but he has never been ignored". Historian John D. Mackie sums up Henry's personality and its impact on his achievements and popularity:

A particular focus of modern historiography has been the extent to which the events of Henry's life (including his marriages, foreign policy and religious changes) were the result of his own initiative and, if they were, whether they were the result of opportunism or of a principled undertaking by Henry. The traditional interpretation of those events was provided by historian A. F. Pollard, who in 1902 presented his own, largely positive, view of the king, lauding him, "as the king and statesman who, whatever his personal failings, led England down the road to parliamentary democracy and empire". Pollard's interpretation remained the dominant interpretation of Henry's life until the publication of the doctoral thesis of G. R. Elton in 1953.

Elton's book on The Tudor Revolution in Government maintained Pollard's positive interpretation of the Henrician period as a whole, but reinterpreted Henry himself as a follower rather than a leader. For Elton, it was Cromwell and not Henry who undertook the changes in government – Henry was shrewd but lacked the vision to follow a complex plan through. Henry was little more, in other words, than an "ego-centric monstrosity" whose reign "owed its successes and virtues to better and greater men about him; most of its horrors and failures sprang more directly from [the king]".

Although the central tenets of Elton's thesis have since been questioned, it has consistently provided the starting point for much later work, including that of J. J. Scarisbrick, his student. Scarisbrick largely kept Elton's regard for Cromwell's abilities but returned agency to Henry, who Scarisbrick considered to have ultimately directed and shaped policy. For Scarisbrick, Henry was a formidable, captivating man who "wore regality with a splendid conviction". The effect of endowing Henry with this ability, however, was largely negative in Scarisbrick's eyes: to Scarisbrick, the Henrician period was one of upheaval and destruction and those in charge worthy of blame more than praise. Even among more recent biographers, including David Loades, David Starkey, and John Guy, there has ultimately been little consensus on the extent to which Henry was responsible for the changes he oversaw or the assessment of those he did bring about.

This lack of clarity about Henry's control over events has contributed to the variation in the qualities ascribed to him: religious conservative or dangerous radical; lover of beauty or brutal destroyer of priceless artefacts; friend and patron or betrayer of those around him; chivalry incarnate or ruthless chauvinist. One traditional approach, favoured by Starkey and others, is to divide Henry's reign into two halves, the first Henry being dominated by positive qualities (politically inclusive, pious, athletic but also intellectual) who presided over a period of stability and calm, and the latter a "hulking tyrant" who presided over a period of dramatic, sometimes whimsical, change. Other writers have tried to merge Henry's disparate personality into a single whole; Lacey Baldwin Smith, for example, considered him an egotistical borderline neurotic given to great fits of temper and deep and dangerous suspicions, with a mechanical and conventional, but deeply held piety, and having at best a mediocre intellect.

Style and arms 

Many changes were made to the royal style during his reign. Henry originally used the style "Henry the Eighth, by the Grace of God, King of England, France and Lord of Ireland". In 1521, pursuant to a grant from Pope Leo X rewarding Henry for his Defence of the Seven Sacraments, the royal style became "Henry the Eighth, by the Grace of God, King of England and France, Defender of the Faith and Lord of Ireland". Following Henry's excommunication, Pope Paul III rescinded the grant of the title "Defender of the Faith", but an Act of Parliament (35 Hen 8 c 3) declared that it remained valid; and it continues in royal usage to the present day, as evidenced by the letters FID DEF or F.D. on all British coinage. Henry's motto was "Coeur Loyal" ("true heart"), and he had this embroidered on his clothes in the form of a heart symbol and with the word "loyal". His emblem was the Tudor rose and the Beaufort portcullis. As king, Henry's arms were the same as those used by his predecessors since Henry IV: Quarterly, Azure three fleurs-de-lys Or (for France) and Gules three lions passant guardant in pale Or (for England).

In 1535, Henry added the "supremacy phrase" to the royal style, which became "Henry the Eighth, by the Grace of God, King of England and France, Defender of the Faith, Lord of Ireland and of the Church of England in Earth Supreme Head". In 1536, the phrase "of the Church of England" changed to "of the Church of England and also of Ireland". In 1541, Henry had the Irish Parliament change the title "Lord of Ireland" to "King of Ireland" with the Crown of Ireland Act 1542, after being advised that many Irish people regarded the Pope as the true head of their country, with the Lord acting as a mere representative. The reason the Irish regarded the Pope as their overlord was that Ireland had originally been given to King Henry II of England by Pope Adrian IV in the 12th century as a feudal territory under papal overlordship. The meeting of the Irish Parliament that proclaimed Henry VIII as King of Ireland was the first meeting attended by the Gaelic Irish chieftains as well as the Anglo-Irish aristocrats. The style "Henry the Eighth, by the Grace of God, King of England, France and Ireland, Defender of the Faith and of the Church of England and also of Ireland in Earth Supreme Head" remained in use until the end of Henry's reign.

Genealogical table

See also 

 Cestui que
 Cultural depictions of Henry VIII
 Family tree of English monarchs
 History of the foreign relations of the United Kingdom
 Inventory of Henry VIII
 List of English monarchs
 Tudor period
 Mouldwarp

Footnotes

References

Bibliography

Further reading

Biographical

Scholarly studies 
 
 
 
 0
 
 
 
 
 
 
 
 
 
 
 
 
 
 
 
 
 
 
 . History of foreign policy

Historiography

Primary sources 
 , (36 volumes, 1862–1908)

External links 

 
 
 Henry VIII at the official website of the British monarchy
 Henry VIII at the official website of the Royal Collection Trust
 
 
 
 
 
 Portraits of Henry VIII

 
1491 births
1547 deaths
15th-century English people
15th-century Roman Catholics
16th-century English nobility
16th-century English monarchs
16th-century Irish monarchs
16th-century English writers
16th-century male writers
16th-century Roman Catholics
16th-century Anglicans
Annulment
British founders
Burials at St George's Chapel, Windsor Castle
Composers of the Tudor period
Converts to Anglicanism from Roman Catholicism
Dukes of Cornwall
Dukes of York
Earls Marshal
English Anglicans
English classical composers
English people of Welsh descent
English pretenders to the French throne
English real tennis players
Founders of religions
House of Tudor
Husbands of Catherine Parr
Knights of the Bath
Knights of the Garter
Knights of the Golden Fleece
Lords Lieutenant of Ireland
Lords Warden of the Cinque Ports
Male Shakespearean characters
Military leaders of the Italian Wars
Musicians from Kent
People associated with the Dissolution of the Monasteries
People excommunicated by the Catholic Church
People from Greenwich
People with endocrine, nutritional and metabolic diseases
People with mood disorders
People with traumatic brain injuries
Princes of Wales
Children of Henry VII of England
Lords of Glamorgan
Sons of kings
Founders of colleges of the University of Oxford
Founders of colleges of the University of Cambridge